Tetraena simplex, commonly known as hureim or simple-leaved bean caper, is a halophytic flowering plant that is distributed in arid regions of the Western Asia and Africa. It is an annual and has a history of being used in Arabic folk medicine as an anti-inflammatory.

Description
Tetraena simplex is a highly branched succulent plant that stands from 8 to 20 cm tall. It has fleshy, simple leaves that are oblong-cylindric in shape. It flowers from August to May and presents with yellow petals.

Distribution and habitat
Tetraena simplex is distributed throughout West Asia and Africa. It can be found as far east as India. The most common habitats are shrub-steppes and deserts and it grows best in salty conditions. In Qatar, it is known locally as daa or hureim (also spelled harm) and is a frequent sight on rocky desert plains.

References

Zygophylloideae
Flora of Qatar
Flora of Egypt
Flora of Saudi Arabia
Flora of Israel
Flora of Oman
Flora of Iran
Flora of the Indian subcontinent
Flora of Palestine (region)
Flora of Namibia
Flora of Western Asia
Flora of Africa